Edder Nelson Martin (born 26 June 1986 in Limón) is a Costa Rican football player who currently plays for Limón Black Star.

Club career
He played the 2009 second division final for Municipal Grecia and later played for Puntarenas. In January 2012, Nelson signed a 6-month contract with Slovakian side Senica but he did not pass a medical.

Cartaginés
On May 29, 2012 Nelson signed a 1-year long contract with Cartaginés. Nelson made his debut for Cartaginés in the opening match in the Winter 2012, against Belén Siglo XXI playing the whole game. On 7 August, Nelson made assistance for the tie against Limón in Cartaginés 1-2 victory, after Hansell Arauz recovered the ball in 3/4 of field, passes to Nelson, running and leaves two opponents to make an assistance to Erick Ponce. On 28 October, Nelson created a play of a wall with Randall Alvarado, made attendance goal to Paolo Jimenez, in the game who lost Cartaginés 1-3 against C.D. Saprissa. On 7 November, he made a goal assisted by Eduardo Valverde in the game who lost Cartaginés 2-3 against C.S. Herediano.

In January 2013, Nelson quit Cartaginés because he did not want to play out of his favoured defensive position and joined Saprissa on loan for a year. He moved to Pérez Zeledón only a few months later.

International career
He made his debut on December 11, 2012 in a friendly match against Cuba in place of Marco Ureña at minute 46.

Career statistics

References

Edder Nelson refuerza a Pérez Zeledón‚ everardoherrera.com, 28 December 2015

External links
 

1986 births
Living people
People from Limón Province
Association football midfielders
Costa Rican footballers
Costa Rica international footballers
Puntarenas F.C. players
C.S. Cartaginés players
Deportivo Saprissa players
Municipal Pérez Zeledón footballers
Milwaukee Wave players
Municipal Grecia players
C.S. Herediano footballers
C.F. Universidad de Costa Rica footballers
Limón F.C. players
Liga FPD players
Major Arena Soccer League players
Costa Rican expatriate sportspeople in the United States
Expatriate soccer players in the United States
Costa Rican expatriate footballers